Paul B. Valenti (September 10, 1920 – September 13, 2014) was an American college basketball coach, known for his long association with Oregon State University.

The son of Italian immigrants from Mill Valley, California, Valenti played basketball for coach Slats Gill at Oregon State from 1939 to 1942.  After a stint in the United States Navy during World War II, Valenti returned to Corvallis in 1946 as an assistant to Gill, and served in that position for 18 years.  Valenti got his first taste of head coaching during the 1959–60 season as he served as interim head coach of the Beavers when Gill fell ill.

Valenti followed his mentor as head coach in 1964.  He had his best season in 1965–66, leading the Beavers to the AAWU (now the Pac-12 Conference) title and a berth in the 1966 NCAA Tournament, after being picked to finish last in the league.  His 1965-66 unit was the only team other than UCLA to win an AAWU/Pac-8/Pac-10 title between 1963–64 and 1978-79.

In his six full seasons as head coach, Valenti compiled a 91–82 record.  Valenti is a member of the Oregon State Athletic Hall of Fame and the Pac-12 Conference Men's Basketball Hall of Honor. He died aged 94 on September 13, 2014.

Head coaching record

References

External links
Paul Valenti Oral History Interview

1920 births
2014 deaths
American men's basketball coaches
American men's basketball players
United States Navy personnel of World War II
American people of Italian descent
Basketball players from California
College men's basketball head coaches in the United States
Forwards (basketball)
Oregon State Beavers men's basketball coaches
Oregon State Beavers men's basketball players
People from Mill Valley, California
Oregon State Beavers baseball coaches